Grose is a surname of two possible origins. Cornish origin: a toponymic surname for a person who lived near a stone cross, from Cornish "crows" or "crous" for "cross".  French origin: from Old French gros: "big, "fat", a variant of surname Gros.

Notable people with the surname include:

Brent Grose (born 1979), Australian rugby league player
Daniel Grose (1903-1971), English cricketer and British Army officer
David Grose (1944–2004), American archaeologist
Francis Grose (1731–1791), antiquary and lexicographer
Francis Grose (Lieutenant-Governor) (circa 1754 – 1814), Lieutenant-Governor of New South Wales
George Richmond Grose (1869–1953), American Methodist bishop
Ingebrikt Grose (1862–1939), first president of Concordia College
Ivan Grose (born 1928), Canadian businessman and politician
John Henry Grose, British traveller
Nash Grose (1740-1814), English Judge
Walter Grose (1862–1940), Australian politician
William Grose (1812–1900), American lawyer
Mrs Grose, a fictional character, a housekeeper, in Henry James's novella The Turn of the Screw

See also

References

Toponymic surnames
Cornish-language surnames
French-language surnames